Arthur Burnham Woodford (October 7, 1861 – November 3, 1946) was an American economist, university professor, college football coach, and grammar school rector. He was the first head coach of the Indiana Hoosiers football team, holding that position from 1887 to 1888.

Early life and education
Woodford was born in Winsted, Connecticut, on October 7, 1861. His parents were John Woodford and Sarah Burnham Woodford. He attended public schools and Williston Seminary before entering Yale University as an undergraduate. He graduated from Yale's Sheffield Scientific School in 1881 with a Bachelor of Philosophy degree. Woodford continued his education as a post-graduate at Yale, the University of Michigan, the Johns Hopkins University, Indiana University, l'École Libre des Sciences Politiques in Paris, and at Berlin University. He received a Master of Arts degree from Indiana University in 1886 and a Doctor of Philosophy degree from Johns Hopkins in 1891.

Professional career
Woodford worked as a special agent for the United States Department of Labor in 1885. From 1885 to 1889, he held a professorship in economics at Indiana University. Teaching at Indiana in 1885, Woodford was the first instructor in the United States to carry an official title containing the word "sociology."
Woodford also served as the first head football coach at Indiana University, coaching the Indiana Hoosiers football team for two seasons, from 1887 to 1888, and compiling a record of 0–1–1.

In 1890, Woodford briefly held a chair—vacated by the death of its holder, Alexander Johnson—in political economy and jurisprudence at Princeton College, but future Princeton and United States president Woodrow Wilson was appointed to the chair for the academic year 1890–91. Moving to the Wharton School of the University of Pennsylvania, Woodford served there as an assistant professor of political economy from 1891 to 1892. From 1892 to 1896, he taught English and economics while serving as president of the School of Social Economics in New York City. He lectured at New York University (NYU) from 1895 to 1898. In 1896 he also took up a post as an instructor at the Hopkins Grammar School. In 1906, he became rector at Hopkins.

Family and death
Woodford married Margaret Cornelia Bowditch of New Haven, Connecticut in 1885. They had three children, Francis Bowditch Woodford, Burnham Bowditch Woodford, and Margaret Bowditch Woodford.

Woodford died on November 3, 1946, at New Haven Hospital in New Haven. He had been ill after a fall at his home two weeks earlier.

Publications
On the Use of Silver as Money in the United States: An Historical Study, 1893
The Economic Primer, 1895

Head coaching record

See also
 List of college football coaches with 0 wins

References

Sources
 Cutter, W.R., Ed. "New England Families, Second Edition", Lewis Historical Publishing Company, 1913, Vol. 3, p. 1457.
 Marquis, A.N., "Who's Who in New England, Second Edition", author, 1916, p. 1177.
 New York Times, "Princeton's Trustees Meet: Woodroe (sic) Wilson Elected to the Chair of Political Economy", 13 February 1890.
 Princeton College Bulletin, "The President's Report to the Board of Trustees", II(2), 25
 Princetonian, untitled editor's remarks, 31 January 1890, XIV (71), 2

External links
 

1861 births
1946 deaths
19th-century American educators
20th-century American educators
American school principals
Indiana Hoosiers football coaches
Indiana University faculty
Johns Hopkins University alumni
New York University faculty
Princeton University faculty
Wharton School of the University of Pennsylvania faculty
Yale School of Engineering & Applied Science alumni
People from Winsted, Connecticut
Coaches of American football from Connecticut
Economists from Connecticut
Schoolteachers from Connecticut